The 1999 Supercopa de España was a Spanish football competition, played over two legs on 8 August and 15 August 1999. It was contested by Valencia, who were Spanish Cup winners in 1998–99, and Barcelona, who won the 1998–99 Spanish League.

Match details

First leg

Second leg

References

Supercopa de Espana Final
Supercopa de Espana 1999
Supercopa de Espana 1999
Supercopa de España